Juan Ramón Luis García (born 19 May 1987 in La Orotava, Tenerife), known as Juan Ramón or Juanra, is a Spanish professional footballer who plays for UD Tenerife Sur Ibarra as a right midfielder.

External links

1987 births
Living people
People from Tenerife
Sportspeople from the Province of Santa Cruz de Tenerife
Spanish footballers
Footballers from the Canary Islands
Association football midfielders
Segunda División players
Segunda División B players
Tercera División players
CD Tenerife B players
CD Tenerife players
Universidad de Las Palmas CF footballers
Zamora CF footballers